Fergus O'Neill (born 27 January 2001) is an Australian cricketer who plays domestic cricket for the Victoria cricket team. He made his List A debut for Victoria against Western Australia in the 2021–22 Marsh One-Day Cup, and his first-class debut in the 2022–23 Sheffield Shield against South Australia.

Career
In 2014, O'Neill and his father Peter O'Neill both scored centuries in the same North West Metro Cricket Association match for the Flemington Colts. Peter retired not out on 106, while Fergus was eventually caught for 104.

O'Neill plays for Melbourne in Victorian Premier Cricket. In 2019 he took a hat-trick against Monash, finishing with career-best figures of 6/25. In the 2021–22 season he received the Paul Sheahan Club Champion Award for his all-round performance, averaging 19.31 with the ball and 42.33 with the bat that year.

His performances in Premier cricket earned him a List A debut for Victoria later that season, as well as a first-class appearance for Victoria the following season in which he took 4 wickets on debut, including the wickets of Australian Test players Alex Carey, and Travis Head (twice).

References

External links
 

2001 births
Living people
Australian cricketers
Victoria cricketers